American Hasidic folk/soul band Zusha has released four studio albums and three EPs. Formed in 2013 by Shlomo Gaisin, Zecharia Goldschmiedt, and Elisha Mlotek, the band's music combines traditional Hasidic nigunim with styles like folk, soul, jazz, and reggae. Their debut album, Kavana (2016), placed on Billboard's Top World Music Albums and Heatseekers Albums charts at #2 and #15 respectively.

Albums

Studio albums

Extended plays

Compilation appearances 

 2019: Various, Only You – "All Worlds" (album produced by Congregation Aish Kodesh)
 2021: Various, Mevakshei Hashem – "Mi LaShem Elai" (album produced by Thank You Hashem)

Singles

As lead artist

As featured artist

Music videos

References 

Discographies of American artists
Folk music discographies
Hasidic music